The Men's 4×100 metre medley relay event at the 2015 African Games took place on 11 September 2015 at Kintele Aquatic Complex.

Schedule
All times are Congo Standard Time (UTC+01:00)

Records

Results

Final 
The final were held on 11 September.

References

External links
Official website

Swimming at the 2015 African Games